Romantic Island is a 2008 South Korean romantic comedy film set in Boracay, Philippines.

Plot

Six Koreans from Seoul travel separately to the Philippines: a middle-aged couple on their first trip overseas with the terminally ill husband plotting to kill himself while on holiday so his unsuspecting wife can claim an insurance payment; a convenience store clerk who meets a runaway pop star; and a happy-go-lucky office worker who gets hired as a tour guide by a rich businessman who came to pay his respects to his estranged dead father.

Cast
Lee Sun-kyun - Kang Jae-hyuk
Lee Soo-kyung - Choi Soo-jin
Lee Min-ki - Jung-hwan 
Eugene - Yoo Ga-young 
Lee Moon-sik - Joong-sik 
Lee Il-hwa - Yoon-suk
Lee Hyun-sook - Soo-jin's mom
Ki Eun-se - Yoo Hye-ra
Song Min-ji - Kim Hyun-joo
Jin Seo-yeon - Sandra
Choi Dae-sung - manager
Kim Jong-soo - mover
Choi Jin-ho - interviewer

References

External links
 Romantic Island at www.romantic2008.kr
 
 

2008 films
Films set in the Philippines
South Korean romantic comedy films
2008 romantic comedy films
Films shot in the Philippines
2000s South Korean films